This is a timeline of the history of news on the British television network ITV.

1950s 

 1955
 January – A consortium of the initial four Independent Television broadcasting companies launch ITN which will provide ITV with its news service.
 22 September – The first news bulletin is broadcast at 10pm on ITV's launch night.
 1956
 6 January – The first edition of current affairs programme This Week is broadcast.
 17 February –  ITV begins broadcasting in the Midlands.
 3 May – ITV starts broadcasting across the north of England.
 1957
 31 August – ITV starts broadcasting in central Scotland.
 1958
 14 January – ITV begins broadcasting in South Wales and the West of England.
 30 August – ITV begins broadcasting across southern England.
 1959
 15 January – ITV commences transmissions across north east England.
 8 October – ITV broadcasts its first election results programme to provide ITV with live coverage of the results of the 1959 United Kingdom general election.
 27 October – ITV starts broadcasting across to east England.
 31 October – ITV launches in Northern Ireland.

1960s 
 1960
31 January – ITV begins broadcasting to south east England. following the Independent Television Authority granting Southern the right to broadcast to South East England.
 1961
 29 April – ITV starts broadcasting to south west England.
 1 September – ITV begins broadcasting to the Scottish Borders.
 30 September – ITV begins broadcasting across northern Scotland.
 1962
 1 September – ITV begins broadcasting to the Channel Islands.
 14 September – The final part of the UK gets an ITV service when Wales (West and North) Television launches in West and North Wales.
 1963
 7 January – The first edition of World in Action is broadcast.
 1964
 No events.
 1965
 26 March – ITV begins broadcasting to the Isle of Man.
 1966
 No events.
 1967
 3 July – News at Ten is launched as a 13-week trial of a nightly 30 minute bulletin. The programme is an immediate success with the audience and is soon made permanent.

 1968
 No events.
 1969
 No events.

1970s 
 1970
 No events.
 1971
 No events.
 1972
 1 October – The UK's first Sunday politics programme Weekend World is broadcast on ITV.
 16 October – Following a law change which removed all restrictions on broadcasting hours, ITV is able to launch an afternoon service. As part of the new service ITV's first lunchtime news programme, First Report, is shown.
 1973
 No events.
 1974
 7 September – First Report is moved to a 1pm start time.
 1975
 No events.
 1976
 6 September – News at One replaces First Report and the teatime news bulletin programme is extended by five minutes and renamed News at 5.45.
 1977
 No events.
 1978
 ITV's teletext service ORACLE launches with ITN providing the news pages.
 1979
 No events.

1980s 
 1980
 No events.
 1981
 No events.
 1982
 ITV provides extensive coverage of the Falklands War with newsflashes supplemented by additional and extended news bulletins.
 1983
 1 February – The launch of ITV's breakfast television service TV-am sees the introduction of news bulletins at breakfast time with bulletins on weekdays aired every 30 minutes. This frequency of weekday breakfast news bulletins continues to this day.
 1984
 No events.
 1985
 No events.
 1986
 No events.
 1987
 20 July – The lunchtime news programme moves to 12:30pm and is renamed accordingly. 
 7 September – ITV launches a full morning programme schedule, with advertising for the first time. The new service includes hourly five-minute national and regional news bulletins.
 1988
 15 February – An early morning 60-minute news programme, ITN Early Morning News is launched but is only available in areas which have 24-hour broadcasting. The first 30 minutes of the programme includes a full broadcast of ITN's international news bulletin ITN World News. In addition, brief news summaries are broadcast at various points through the night. 
 7 March – The lunchtime news returns to the 1pm slot.
 1989
 15 February – The introduction of a national weather forecast at the end of national news bulletins results in the News at 5.45 starting earlier at 5:40pm, being extended in length and the title being changed to News at 540.

1990s 
 1990
 No events.
 1991
 7 January – The lunchtime news returns to the 12:30pm slot.
 16 January–2 March – ITV broadcasts extensive live coverage of the Gulf War, both in terms of extended news bulletins and special programmes, including a daily bulletin at 9:25am and an all-night bulletin during the initial stages of the War.
 March – Following the conclusion of the Gulf War, the ITN Early Morning News is halved in length and now goes on air at 5:30am. Some time later, the ITN World News ceases to be broadcast as part of the bulletin.
 1992
 February – TV-am closes its in-house news service and contracts out news bulletins to Sky News. This is the first time that any output from Sky News has been seen on terrestrial television and continues until 31 December, TV-am's last day on air.
 2 March – News at 540 is renamed ITN Early Evening News.
 17 December – Ahead of the loss of its franchise, the final edition of the Thames Television produced current affairs series This Week is broadcast.
 1993
 No events.
 1994
 No events.
 1995
 ITV News bulletins all carry the same look for the first time when ITN programmes are relaunched with a unified look.
 1996
 No events.
 1997
 31 August – Television schedules are dominated by coverage of the Diana, Princess of Wales's car accident. ITV cancels its regular programmes to provide non-stop rolling coverage until mid-evening. The following week sees ITV broadcast extended news bulletins and special programmes are broadcast.
 6 September – ITV broadcasts live coverage of the funeral of Diana, Princess of Wales. It is watched by 2.5 billion viewers worldwide with 32.1 million watching in the UK, making it the biggest audience for a live broadcast ever. The ceremony's footage goes down in the Guinness World Records as the biggest TV audience for a live broadcast.
 ITV, via ITN, starts producing the Royal Christmas Message every other year.
 1998
 7 December – After 35 years on air, World in Action is broadcast for the final time.
 1999
 5 March – ITV News at Ten is broadcast for the final time.
 8 March – Major changes to ITV's news programmes take place, including different times for the channel's news programmes and the programmes were referred to as ITV News rather than ITN News. The main bulletin of the day is now considered to be the Early Evening News and is moved from 5:40pm to 6:30pm and the evening news is controversially pushed back to 11pm although the following year the ITC forces ITV to move the late evening news back to 10pm on three nights each week. Also, ITV's lunchtime news bulletin is relaunched as ITV Lunchtime News.
 8 April – The first edition of ITV's new current affairs series Tonight is broadcast.

2000s 
 2000
 1 August – The ITN News Channel launches.
 2001
 11 September – Viewers around the world witness a terrorist attack on the United States and the collapse of the Twin Towers in New York City.
 2002
 30 September – Carlton and Granada purchase the two year-old ITN News Channel and it is renamed ITV News Channel.
 2003
 ITV provides live extensive coverage of the Iraq War with extended news coverage on ITV and rolling coverage on the ITV News Channel. News at Ten is moved to 9pm for the duration of the conflict and the ITV Evening News was extended to 60 minutes. A simulcast of the ITV News Channel aired from midnight to 5:30am every night on ITV.
 2004
 2 February – After several years of inconsistent scheduling of the late evening news, the bulletin moves to five nights a week with a 10:30pm start time.
2005
 11 February – The ITV Lunchtime News is extended to last 60 minutes.
 23 December – The ITV News Channel stops broadcasting at 6pm. Poor ratings in comparison to BBC News 24 and Sky News and ITV's desire to reuse the channel's allocation on Freeview, were cited as the reasons.
 2006
 4 September – The ITV Lunchtime News reverts to being a 30-minute programme and its start time is moved back to 1:30pm.
 2007
 1 April – ITN announced that ITV had awarded it a 6-year contract to produce ITV News, at a cost of £250 million.
 2 December – ITV News begins broadcasting in 16:9 widescreen.

 2008
 14 January – ITV News at Ten returns to the schedules on four nights each week, the Friday edition remains at 11pm.

 2009
 2 November – ITV News is rebranded. At the heart of the revamp is the removal of the famous image of the Big Ben clock tower from the opening sequence of ITV News programmes including News at Ten, ITV executives felt that after "months of deliberation" that the imagery of the landmark promoted London-centricity to viewers outside the capital. A clockface is remained as part of the studio backdrop and also appears within the opening titles and the headline bongs are also retained. New theme music is introduced which incorporates only a few elements of the previous ITV News theme.
 15 December – With the exception of its travel and holiday sections, ITV's teletext service stops broadcasting.

2010s
2010
 No events.
2011
 No events.
2012
 21 December – The final edition of ITV's early morning news programme ITV News at 5:30 is broadcast. Consequently, there is no longer any overnight news coverage on ITV.
2013
 14 January – Regional news services are rebranded with the ITV News name, for example, Anglia Tonight is renamed ITV News Anglia and Central News is now ITV News Central.
2014
 No events.
2015
 October – A new format for ITV News at Ten is launched as part of a move to enhance the reputation of ITV's news and current affairs output.

2016
 No events.
2017
 No events.
2018
 No events.
2019
 No events.

2020s
2020
 No events.
2021
 No events.
2022
 7 March – ITV launches an extended ITV Evening News with its running time increased from 30 to 60 minutes with greater focus on stories and events outside London.

See also 
 Timeline of ITV
 Timeline of ITN
 Timeline of regional news on ITV

References

Television in the United Kingdom by year
ITV timelines
United Kingdom news broadcasting timelines